Lindsay Garbatt (born ) is a Canadian female boxer and mixed martial artist. She competes professionally since 2008 and is the current women's International Boxing Association champion and mixed martial artist.

Boxing record

|-
| style="text-align:center;" colspan="8"|8 Wins ( 3 knockouts, 7 decisions), 7 Losses (0 decisions, 0 retirement), 2 Draws
|-
!style="border-style: none none solid solid; background: #e3e3e3"|Result
!style="border-style: none none solid solid; background: #e3e3e3"|Record
!style="border-style: none none solid solid; background: #e3e3e3"|Opponent
!style="border-style: none none solid solid; background: #e3e3e3"|Type
!style="border-style: none none solid solid; background: #e3e3e3"|Rd, Time
!style="border-style: none none solid solid; background: #e3e3e3"|Date
!style="border-style: none none solid solid; background: #e3e3e3"|Location
!style="border-style: none none solid solid; background: #e3e3e3"|Notes
|-
| Loss
| 8–7–2
|  Chun Yan Xu
| MD	
| 
| 2014-02-05
| Align=left| City Hall, Haikou, China
|vacant WBC International female featherweight title
|-
| Win
| 8–6–2
|  Jackie Trivilino
| MD
| 
| 2013-10-25
| Align=left| Washington Avenue Armory, Albany, New York, USA
|vacant Women's International Boxing Association World featherweight title
|-
| Draw
| 8–6–2
|  Jackie Trivilino
| SD
| 
| 2013-07-26
| Align=left| City Center, Saratoga Springs, New York, USA
| 
|-
| Loss
| 
|  Ronica Jeffrey
| UD
| 
| 2012-08-31
| Align=left| Dover Downs Hotel & Casino, Dover, Delaware, USA
| vacant WBC Silver female super featherweight title
|-
| Loss
| 7–5–0
|  Jelena Mrdjenovich
| TKO
| 
| 2012-03-23
| Align=left| Shaw Conference Centre, Edmonton, Alberta, Canada
| vacant WBC World female featherweight title, Women's International Boxing Association World featherweight title
|-
| Loss
| 7–4–1
|  Diana Prazak
| TKO
| 
| 2011-09-24
| Align=left| Grand Star Receptions, Altona North, Victoria, Australia
| Women's International Boxing Association World super featherweight title 
|-
| Win
| 9–2–0
|  Jelena Mrdjenovich
| MD
| 
| 2011-02-04
| Align=left| Shaw Conference Centre, Edmonton, Alberta, Canada
|Women's International Boxing Association World super featherweight title
|-
| Win
| 8–2–0
|  Jelena Mrdjenovich 
| SD	
| 
| 2010-11-19
| Align=left| Shaw Conference Centre, Edmonton, Alberta, Canada
| vacant Women's International Boxing Association World super featherweight title
|-
| Draw
| 7–2–1
|   Melissa Hernandez
| MD
| 
| 2010-10-16
| Align=left| Santa Ana Star Casino, Bernalillo, New Mexico, USA
|vacant Global Boxing Union Female World super featherweight title, vacant Women's International Boxing Association World super featherweight title
|-
| Win
| 7–1–0
|  Melissa Hernandez
| MD
| 
| 2010-06-05
| Align=left| National Guard Armory, Evansville, Indiana, USA
| 
|-
| Loss
| 6–1–0
|  Jeannine Garside
| KO
| 
| 2010-04-24
| Align=left| Fuller Lake Arena, Chemainus, British Columbia, Canada
|
|-
| Win
| 5–1–0
|  Ayana Pelletier
| UD
| 
| 2009-11-13
| Align=left| Shaw Conference Centre, Edmonton, Alberta, Canada
|
|-
| Win
| 4–1–0
|  Maureen Shea
| TKO	
| 
| 2009-08-01
| Align=left| Mohegan Sun Casino, Uncasville, Connecticut, USA
| 
|-
| Loss
| 3–1–0
|  Ela Nunez
| UD
| 
| 2008-11-19
| Align=left| OnCenter, Syracuse, New York, USA
|
|-
| Win
| 2–1–0
|  Lucia Larcinese
| TKO
|  
| 2008-07-19
| Align=left| Quinte Sports Centre, Belleville, Ontario, Canada
|
|-
| Win
| 1–1–0
|  Tracy Hutt
| KO
| 
| 2008-03-05
| Align=left| Hammerstein Ballroom, New York, New York, USA
| 
|-
| Loss
| 0–1–0
|  Ela Nunez
| MD	
| 
| 2007-08-16
| Align=left| Frontier Field, Rochester, New York
|

Mixed martial arts record

|Loss
|align=center|6-6
|Lupita Godinez
|Decision (unanimous)
|BTC 8: Eliminator
|
|align=center|5
|align=center|5:00
|Niagara Falls, Ontario, Canada
|
|-
|Loss
|align=center|6-5
|Cheyanne Vlismas
|Decision (unanimous)
|BTC 6: Night of Champions
|
|align=center|3
|align=center|5:00
|Burlington, Ontario, Canada
|
|-
|Loss
|align=center|6-4
|Rayanne Amanda
|Submission (armbar)
|BTC 4: Vendetta
|
|align=center|1
|align=center|1:50
|Peterborough, Ontario, Canada
|
|-
|Win
|align=center|6-3
|Rayanne Amanda
|Decision (majority)
|BTC 3: Profecy
|
|align=center|3
|align=center|5:00
|Burlington, Ontario, Canada
|
|-
|Loss
|align=center|5-3
|Ashley Nichols
|Decision (unanimous)
|TKO 39- Ultimatum
|
|align=center|3
|align=center|5:00
|Saint-Roch-de-l'Achigan, Quebec, Canada
|
|-
|Win
|align=center|5-2
|Corinne Laframboise
|KO (punch)
|TKO 39 - Ultimatum
|
|align=center|1
|align=center|1:53
|Saint-Roch-de-l'Achigan, Quebec, Canada
|
|-
|Loss
|align=center|4-2
|Griet Eeckhout
|Submission (rear-naked choke)
|TKO 37 - Rivals
|
|align=center|1
|align=center|3:07
|Montréal, Canada
|
|-
|Win
|align=center|4-1
|Maguy Orton Berchel
|TKO (punches)
|TKO 36 - The Return
|
|align=center|3
|align=center|3:30
|Montréal, Canada
|
|-
|Win
|align=center|3-1
|Valeria Mejia
|TKO (punches)
|HKFC - School of Hard Knocks 46
|
|align=center|3
|align=center|0:25
|Calgary, Alberta, Canada
|
|-
|Loss
|align=center|2-1
|Calie Cutler
|Decision (unanimous)
|WXC 59 - Homeland Pride
|
|align=center|3
|align=center|5:00
|Taylor, Michigan, United States
|
|-
|Win
|align=center|2–0
|Shiori Hori
|TKO (Punches)
|Pancrase - 265
|
|align=center|1
|align=center|1:01
|Tokyo, Japan
|
|-
|Win
|align=center|1–0
|Stephanie Essensa
|Decision (Unanimous)
|HKFC - School of Hard Knocks 40
|
|align=center|3
|align=center|5:00
|Calgary, Alberta, Canada
|

References

1983 births
Living people
Canadian female mixed martial artists
Canadian women boxers
Flyweight mixed martial artists
Mixed martial artists utilizing boxing
World featherweight boxing champions
World boxing champions